Syreitschikovia is a genus of flowering plants in the family Asteraceae.

 Species
 Syreitschikovia spinulosa (Franch.) Pavlov - Uzbekistan, Kyrgyzstan, Tajikistan
 Syreitschikovia tenuifolia (Bong.) Pavlov - Xinjiang, Kazakhstan, Uzbekistan, Kyrgyzstan, Tajikistan
 Syreitschikovia tenuis (Bunge) Botsch. - Tarbagatai Mountains in Xinjiang + Kazakhstan

References

Asteraceae genera
Cynareae